Per Thomas Eriksson (born 1 May 1963 in Arbrå, Gävleborg) is a retired male high jumper from Sweden. He also competed in the men's triple jump during his career.

He finished ninth at the 1984 European Indoor Championships. He became Swedish champion in 1990 and 1991, and also has four gold medals in long and triple jump. He represented the sports clubs Turebergs FK and Arbrå IK. He became NCAA champion in 1985 for Lamar University.

His personal highest jump was 2.32 metres, achieved in June 1985 in Austin.

Achievements

References
sports-reference

1963 births
Living people
Athletes (track and field) at the 1984 Summer Olympics
Lamar Cardinals track and field athletes
Olympic athletes of Sweden
Swedish expatriates in the United States
Swedish male high jumpers
Swedish male triple jumpers